"If Love Was Like Guitars" is the third solo single released by Ian McNabb. The song was taken from the album Truth and Beauty. It charted at number 67 on the UK Singles Chart.

Track listings
7"
 "If Love Was Like Guitars" (4:06)
 "Trams in Amsterdam" (3:45)

CD
 "If Love Was Like Guitars" (4:06)
 "Trams in Amsterdam" (3:45)
 "Great Dreams of Heaven" (Acoustic) (4:58)

References

1993 singles
Ian McNabb songs
1992 songs